Jazz harmony  is the theory and practice of how chords are used in jazz music. Jazz bears certain similarities to other practices in the tradition of Western harmony, such as many chord progressions, and the incorporation of the major and minor scales as a basis for chordal construction. In jazz, chords are often arranged vertically in major or minor thirds, although stacked fourths are also quite common. Also, jazz music tends to favor certain harmonic progressions and includes the addition of tensions, intervals such as 9ths, 11ths, and 13ths to chords. Additionally, scales unique to style are used as the basis of many harmonic elements found in jazz. Jazz harmony is notable for the use of seventh chords as the basic harmonic unit more often than triads, as in classical music. In the words of Robert Rawlins and Nor Eddine Bahha, "7th chords provide the building blocks of jazz harmony."

The piano and guitar are the two instruments that typically provide harmony for a jazz group. Players of these instruments deal with harmony in a real-time, flowing improvisational context as a matter of course. This is one of the greatest challenges in jazz.

In a big-band context, the harmony is the basis for horn material, melodic counterpoint, and so on. The improvising soloist is expected to have a complete knowledge of the basics of harmony, as well as their own unique approach to chords and their relationship to scales. A personal style is composed of these building blocks and a rhythmic concept.

Jazz composers use harmony as a basic stylistic element as well. Open, modal harmony is characteristic of the music of McCoy Tyner, whereas rapidly shifting key centers is a hallmark of the middle period of John Coltrane's writing. Horace Silver, Clare Fischer, Dave Brubeck, and Bill Evans are pianists whose compositions are more typical of the chord-rich style associated with pianist-composers. Joe Henderson, Woody Shaw, Wayne Shorter and Benny Golson are non-pianists who also have a strong sense of the role of harmony in compositional structure and mood. These composers (including also Dizzy Gillespie and Charles Mingus, who recorded infrequently as pianists) have musicianship grounded in chords at the piano, even though they are not performing keyboardists.

The authentic cadence (V-I) is the most important one in both classical and jazz harmony, though in jazz it more often follows a ii or II chord serving as predominant. To cite Rawlins and Bahha, as above: "The ii-V-I [progression] provides the cornerstone of jazz harmony"

The ii-V-I may appear differently in major or minor keys, m7-dom-maj7 or m75-dom9-minor.

Other central features of jazz harmony are diatonic and non-diatonic reharmonizations, the addition of the V7(sus4) chord as a dominant and non-dominant functioning chord, major/minor interchange, blues harmony, secondary dominants, extended dominants, deceptive resolution, related ii-V7 chords, direct modulations, the use of contrafacts, common chord modulations, and dominant chord modulations using ii-V progressions.

Bebop or "straight-ahead" jazz, in which only certain of all possible extensions and alterations are used, is distinguished from free, avant-garde, or post-bop jazz harmony.

Chord symbols
Analytic practice in Jazz recognizes four basic chord types, plus diminished seventh chords. The four basic chord types are major, minor, minor-major, and dominant. When written in a jazz chart, these chords may have alterations specified in parentheses after the chord symbol. An altered note is a note which is a deviation from the canonical chord tone.

There is variety in the chord symbols used in jazz notation. A jazz musician must have facility in the alternate notation styles which are used. The following chord symbol examples use C as a root tone for example purposes. 

Most jazz chord symbols designate four notes. Each typically has a "role" as root, third, fifth, or seventh, although they may be severely altered and possibly use an enharmonic spelling which masks this underlying identity. For example, jazz harmony theoretician Jim Knapp has suggested that the 9 and even the 9 alterations are functioning in the root role.

The jazz chord naming system is as deterministic as the composer wishes it to be. A rule of thumb is that chord alterations are included in a chart only when the alteration appears in the melody or is crucial to essence of the composition. Skilled improvisers are able to supply an idiomatic, highly altered harmonic vocabulary even when written chord symbols contain no alterations.

It is possible to specify chords with more than four notes. For example, the chord C-Δ9 contains the notes (C E G B D).

Melodic Minor Scale
Much of jazz harmony is based on the melodic minor scale (using only the "ascending" scale as defined in classical harmony). The modes of this scale are the basis for much jazz improvisation and are variously named as below, using the key of C-minor as an example:

The VII chord in particular is rich with alterations. As it contains the notes and alterations (I, 9, m3/9, M3, 5/11, 13, m7), it is particularly important in the jazz harmonic idiom, notably as a V chord in a minor key. For our example key of C-minor, the V chord is G7, so the improviser would draw upon the G7 altered scale (mode VII of the A melodic minor). A complete ii-V-i progression in C-minor7 extended 9 flattened fifth might suggest the following:

See also
 Altered chord
 Bebop scale
 Chord-scale system
 Modal jazz
 Tritone substitution

Further reading 
 Harmonie et orchestration pour orchestra de danse, Robert de Kers (de) (1906–1987), Brussels: Éditions musicales Charles Bens (1944);  & 
 Popular and Jazz Harmony for Composers, Arrangers, and Performers (revised ed.), Daniel Anthony Ricigliano, New York: Donato Music Publishing Company (1969); 
 DOG EAR Tritone Substitution for Jazz Guitar, by R. Ken, Amazon Digital Services, Inc. (2012); ASIN: B008FRWNIW

References 

Harmony
Jazz techniques